USNS LTC John U.D. Page (AK-4496), was the lead ship of the  built in 1985. The ship is named after Lieutenant Colonel John U. D. Page, an American soldier who was awarded the Medal of Honor during Korean War.

Construction and commissioning 
The ship was built in 1985 at the Daewoo Shipyard, Koje, Yeongnam. She was put into the service of United States Lines as American Utah and Irene D from 1985 until the company's bankruptcy in 1986.

Sea-Land Service later acquired the ship in 1988 and put in service as Utah and Newark Bay until 2000.

In October 2000, the ship was chartered by the Maersk Line for the Military Sealift Command and was put into the Prepositioning Program and the Maritime Prepositioning Ship Squadron 2 as MV LTC John U.D. Page (AK-4496) on 1 March 2001.

In 2015, the ship left for scrap in Rotterdam, Netherlands by Sea2Cradlen and the recycling process was completed by 2016.

References

LTC John U.D. Page-class cargo ship
1985 ships
Ships built in South Korea
Merchant ships of the United States
Bulk carriers
Cargo ships of the United States Navy
Container ships of the United States Navy